Heinz Schilcher (14 April 1947 – 20 July 2018) was an Austrian football player and manager, who worked as a scout for AFC Ajax.

International career
As a player, Schilcher was capped once for the Austria national team.

Coaching career
In 1976 Schilcher briefly managed RC Strasbourg. On 1 July 2007, he signed a contract with AFC Ajax as a scout for Southern and Eastern Europe.

Honours
AFC Ajax
 European Cup (2): 1971–72, 1972–73
 Eredivisie (2): 1971–72, 1972–73
 KNVB Cup: 1971–72

References

1947 births
2018 deaths
People from Murtal District
Footballers from Styria
Austrian footballers
Austrian football managers
Association football midfielders
Austria international footballers
Grazer AK players
SK Sturm Graz players
AFC Ajax players
Paris FC players
Nîmes Olympique players
RC Strasbourg Alsace players
Austrian Football Bundesliga players
Eredivisie players
Ligue 1 players
Ligue 2 players
RC Strasbourg Alsace managers
Austrian expatriate footballers
Austrian expatriate sportspeople in the Netherlands
Expatriate footballers in the Netherlands
Austrian expatriate sportspeople in France
Expatriate footballers in France